Carașova is a commune in Caraș-Severin County, Romania. It is known especially for its geographical placement and for the origin of its Croatian inhabitants, the Krashovani. The population of the commune numbered 3,110 people at the 2011 census.

Geography
Carașova is located in Caraș-Severin County, in the historical region of Banat, at a distance of 15 kilometers from Reșița. It is found in a mountainous area on the upper course of the river Caraș, near the entrance to the Semenic-Cheile Carașului National Park.

Villages

The commune is composed of three villages:
Carașova, pop. 2,341 in 2011
Iabalcea, pop. 234 in 2011
Nermed (also Neremić), pop. 535 in 2011

Demographics

According to the 2011 census in Romania, the population of Carașova municipality comprises 76.5% Croats, 7.9% Romanians, 6.6% others, and 5.5% Romani. 72.1% speak Croatian as first language. The commune is officially bilingual, with both Romanian and Croatian being used as working languages on public signage and in administration, education and justice. 

Most of the inhabitants of the commune (89.3%) are Roman Catholics, and 8.5% Orthodox.

History
The first time attested in 1323 under the name of Kraso. Other similar names were later used, depending on which administration used them (Karasow - 1333, Nog Carassou and Kyskarassou - 1358, led by the knyaz Bozorad, Krassowcz - 1535, Crassowcz - 1550, Crasso - 1597, Karasevo - 1690-1700, Karasova - 1717 and after until 1899 Krassova when it was changed to Krassóvár).

Due to the citadel built nearby, Carașova was in the past an important administrative, political and religious centre. In 1333, Carașova was the headquarters of a Roman Catholic diocese which appears to have existed since 1285, but ceased to exist after the events of 1537, and was restored only in 1860, to be disbanded again in 1913.

In various documents of early 18th century, such as the census of 1690-1700 and the conscription of 1717, Carașova was mentioned as having 400 houses, being one of the largest settlements in the area between the Tisa, Mureș and the Danube, being surpassed only by Timișoara and Caransebeş.

In the mid-18th century, according to the administrative organization prior to the Military Frontier of 1768, Carașova was part of the Vršac county and it was the capital of the administrative circle with the same name which included 32 towns, including Reșița, Dognecea, Bocşa, and here were located an administrative office, an Eastern Orthodox church, and Roman Catholic church.

Krashovani

Most of the people of Carașova are Krashovani, which are named by the Banat Romanians cârșoveni, carașoveni, cotcoreți and cocoși, while the Croats call themselves Krašovani, Karašovani, Karaševci.

Until 1989, most of the people called themselves carașoveni and their language carașoveană and considered themselves a people distinct to the other Slavic peoples around the area, such as Serbian, Croatian or Bulgarian. After 1989, the vast majority started identifying themselves as Croats.

Politics and administration 
The administration of Carașova consists of a mayor and a local council composed of 11 councilors. The mayor, Petru Bogdan, from the Social Democratic Party, has been in office since 2016, being re-elected in 2020.

References

External links
 Official website Carașova 
 Union of Croats in Romania 
 Carasova.net 

Communes in Caraș-Severin County
Localities in Romanian Banat
Place names of Slavic origin in Romania